"Alone Together" is a song composed by Arthur Schwartz with lyrics by Howard Dietz. It was introduced in the Broadway musical Flying Colors in 1932 by Jean Sargent.

The song soon became a hit, with Leo Reisman and His Orchestra's 1932 recording (vocal by Frank Luther) being the first to reach the charts. It has become a jazz standard. The first jazz musician to record the song was Artie Shaw in 1939.

Other versions
 Pepper Adams - Conjuration: Fat Tuesday's Session (1957)
 Chet Baker - Chet (1959)
 Tony Bennett - recorded on February 28, 1960, for his album Alone Together (1960).
 Pat Boone - for his album The Touch of Your Lips (1964).
 Ray Charles and Betty Carter – Ray Charles and Betty Carter (1961)
 Vic Damone - for his album This Game of Love (1959).
 Miles Davis – Blue Moods (1955)
 Paul Desmond with Jim Hall – Take Ten (1963)
 Judy Garland - That's Entertainment! (1960)
 Dizzy Gillespie – (1950)
 Charlie Haden – None but the Lonely Heart (1997)
 Peggy Lee - for the album Things Are Swingin' (1959).
 Julie London - Make Love to Me (1957).
 Barry Manilow - Night Songs (2014).
 Sonny Rollins – Sonny Rollins and the Contemporary Leaders (1958)
 Wallace Roney – Obsession (1990)
 Artie Shaw – (1939)
 Archie Shepp - Blue Ballads (1996)
 Carly Simon - included in her album Moonlight Serenade (2005).
 Jo Stafford – a single release (1945).
 Mel Torme - included in his album My Kind of Music (1961).
 Stanley Turrentine – Easy Walker (1966)
 Mal Waldron – No More Tears (1988)
 Margaret Whiting - recorded on August 19, 1952, for Capitol Records (catalog No. 2217).
Bill Evans - Live At The Trident Club (1964)
Paul DeFiglia - solo upright bass for his album In Daylight (2021)
Catherine Russell - title track on her 2019 album

See also
List of 1930s jazz standards

Notes

1930s jazz standards
1932 songs
Songs from musicals
Songs with music by Arthur Schwartz
Songs with lyrics by Howard Dietz
Jazz compositions in D minor